Trash Can (stylized as Trash Can - EP) is an extended play by Nigerian rapper Ice Prince. It was released for free digital download by Chocolate City on January 29, 2015. Ice Prince enlisted TMXO, City Monstar, Drey Beatz, and T Sleek to produce the EP. Trash Can comprises six songs and features a guest appearance from Joules Da Kid.

Track listing

Personnel
Ice Prince Zamani - Primary artist 
Joules Da Kid - Featured artist
TMXO - Production
Drey Beatz - Production 
T Sleek - Production 
City Monstar - Production

References

Ice Prince albums
2015 EPs
Chocolate City (music label) albums